Lilian Pateña is a Filipino scientist who discovered a breed of calamansi and seedless pomelo and discovered micropropagation which established the banana industry in the Philippines. She is also an inventor of leaf-bud cutting in cassava. She was recognized as one of The Outstanding Women in the Nation's Service (TOWNS) in 1998, Women of Distinction for Science and Technology in 1995, and Outstanding Young Scientist in 1990.

References 

 Lilian Formalejo Pateña, Scientist Database, Webdb.STII.DOST.gov.ph
 Lilian Formalejo Pateña, Scientist Profile, Web Database System, Webdb.STII.DOST.gov.ph
 Lilian F. Pateña, Researcher Curriculum Vitae, UPD.edu.ph
 Secretary Professor Lilian F. Pateña, UPLB.edu.ph
 Ms. Lilian Pateña, Los Baños Chapter, Officers of All UP Academic Employees Union, All UP Academic Employees Union, ALLUPAU.multiply.com
 Dr. Lilian Pateña, Philippines, Affiliation Ex Situ Conservation Group, South East Asia Regional Group: (...) "Lilian (Pateña) is a University Researcher and Project Leader at the Institute of Plant Breeding, University of the Philippines, and is working on the conservation of indigenous Philippine orchids, including seed storage and regeneration of conserved seeds using in vitro techniques." (...), Orchid Specialist Group

Year of birth missing (living people)
Living people
21st-century Filipino scientists